Pediasia fulvitinctellus is a moth in the family Crambidae. It was described by George Hampson in 1896. It is found in South Africa.

References

Endemic moths of South Africa
Crambini
Moths described in 1896
Moths of Africa